The International Journal of Foundations of Computer Science is a computer science journal published by World Scientific. It was founded in 1990, covering the field of theoretical computer science, from algebraic theory and algorithms, to quantum computing and wireless networks. Since 1997, the Editor-in-Chief has been Oscar Ibarra of the Department of Computer Science, University of California.

According to the Journal Citation Reports, the journal has a 2020 impact factor of 0.416.

Abstracting and indexing 

The Journal is abstracted and indexed by:

 Mathematical Reviews
 Inspec
 DBLP Bibliography Server
 Zentralblatt MATH
 Science Citation Index Expanded
 ISI Alerting Services
 CompuMath Citation Index
 Current Contents/Engineering, Computing & Technology
 MathSciNet
 Computer Abstracts

External links 
 
 Journal website at World Scientific

Computer science journals
Publications established in 1990
World Scientific academic journals